Middle Early College High School is a magnet high school located in the City of Buffalo, New York. The school opened in September 2004 and has approximately 305 students. The current principal is David Potter.

History 

The school opened in 2004 with students in 9th and 10th grade, adding a new grade level each year until 2009. Originally, MECHS was housed in the fourth floor of the Swan Building in Downtown Buffalo. The school moved to School 87 on Clinton Street in the Fall of 2014. In 2015, the school moved to the Bennett High School campus in North Buffalo. Beginning in 2016, Middle Early College began offering a new computer science-based school called Computing Academy of Technological Sciences.

Former principal 
Previous assignment and reason for departure denoted in parentheses
Susan M. Doyle–2004-2020 (Principal - Buffalo Traditional School, retired)

Academics 

Middle Early College houses students from Grades 9–12. Students must attend the school for five years instead of the traditional four years. There is an exception for students who are advanced and can graduate within the traditional four years. Students graduate with both a high school diploma and an associate degree from Erie Community College in either Criminal Justice, Building and Trades, Office Technology, or Business Administration. Classes at MECHS use block scheduling in which Monday/Wednesday/Friday classes are 64 minutes in length, and Tuesday/Thursday classes are 98 minutes. The students have use of the science labs, library, gym facilities, and pool at the college.

References

External links 
 

High schools in New York (state)
Public high schools in New York (state)
Schools in Buffalo, New York
Schools in Erie County, New York